Caring is the debut album by American singer Rosie Gaines, released October 8, 1985.

Track listing

 "Dance All Night Long" – 5:52
 "I've Gone Too Far" – 4:40
 "Skool-ology (Ain't No Strain)" – 3:56
 "Caring" – 6:41
 "Frustration" – 4:15
 "Wake Up" – 5:17
 "Good Times" – 5:20
 "What Are We Coming To" – 3:55
 "Innocent Girl" – 3:24

Personnel
Rosie Gaines - vocals, backing vocals, piano, electric piano, synthesizer, percussion
Dan Huff, Levi Seacer, Jr., Steph Birnbaum - guitar
Curtis Ohlson - guitar, bass
Dave Goldblatt, Denzil "Broadway" Miller, Frank Martin, Greg Phillinganes - synthesizer
Mick Mestick, Paul Van Wageningen - drums
Paulinho da Costa - percussion
Marc Russo - alto saxophone
Wilton Felder - tenor saxophone

Singles
"Skool-ology (Ain't No Strain)"
"Skool-ology (Ain't No Strain)" (Extended Version) – 5:24
"Skool-ology (Ain't No Strain)" (Extended Instrumental Version) – 5:24

References

Rosie Gaines albums
1985 debut albums
Epic Records albums